Samuel Banks was a professional rugby league footballer who played in the 1900s. He played at club level for Wakefield Trinity (Heritage № 99), as a forward (prior to the specialist positions of), during the era of contested scrums.

References

External links
Search for "Banks" at rugbyleagueproject.org

English rugby league players
Hull F.C. players
Place of birth missing
Place of death missing
Rugby league forwards
Wakefield Trinity players
Year of birth missing
Year of death missing